The Soviet Union (USSR) competed at the 1980 Winter Olympics in Lake Placid, United States.

Medalists

Alpine skiing

Men

Women

Biathlon

Men

Men's 4 x 7.5 km relay

Cross-country skiing

Men

Men's 4 × 10 km relay

Women

Women's 4 × 5 km relay

Figure skating

Men

Women

Pairs

Ice Dancing

Ice hockey

First round

Final round

Carried over group match:
  Finland 2–4 USSR 

Roster
 #1 Vladimir Myshkin G
 #20 Vladislav Tretiak G
 #2 Viacheslav Fetisov D
 #5 Vasily Pervukhin D
 #6 Valery Vasiliev D (A)
 #7 Alexei Kasatonov D
 #12 Sergei Starikov D
 #14 Zinetula Bilyaletdinov D
 #9 Vladimir Krutov F
 #10 Alexander Maltsev F
 #11 Yuri Lebedev F
 #13 Boris Mikhailov F (C)
 #16 Vladimir Petrov F
 #17 Valery Kharlamov F
 #19 Helmut Balderis F
 #22 Viktor Zhluktov F
 #23 Aleksandr Golikov F
 #24 Sergei Makarov F
 #25 Vladimir Golikov F
 #26 Aleksandr Skvortsov F

Coaches

 Head Coach - Victor Tikhonov

Luge

Men

(Men's) doubles

Women

Nordic combined 

Events:
 normal hill ski jumping 
 15 km cross-country skiing

Ski jumping

Speed skating

Men

Women

References
Official Olympic Reports
International Olympic Committee results database
 Olympic Winter Games 1980, full results by sports-reference.com

Nations at the 1980 Winter Olympics
1980
Winter Olympics